Microsoft SharedView (codenamed Tahiti) is a remote desktop and internet collaboration application for screen sharing, group chats and sharing documents with multiple people in real time. The program is free but no longer supported by Microsoft; the Shareview service has been shut down, and the last released version is 1.0.

Overview
Microsoft SharedView allows connecting with up to 15 people in different locations. Users can be invited to join a session by email or IM. They are able to communicate with each other by being able to view each other's screens and control them. Also, handouts, or files, can be broadcast by one to all users. Creation of a session is done with Windows Live ID. SharedView also provides integration into Microsoft Office applications and Windows Live Messenger. For example, in Microsoft Office Word, if tracked changes are turned on and another user is granted control and changes the documents, those changes are tracked as being done by that user. SharedView is partially ad-supported by advertisements from Live Search.

SharedView is similar to Windows Meeting Space, which is included in Windows Vista. However, Windows Meeting Space supports ad hoc meetings, application sharing, file transfer, and simple messaging within a network and works primarily inside the firewall, requiring IT involvement (on both sides) to bridge firewalls. Microsoft SharedView, in contrast, is designed for collaboration over the internet. It works through firewalls using HTTP if necessary. SharedView also runs on Windows XP Service Pack 2 and Windows Server 2003 SP1 or later besides Windows Vista.

After releasing SharedView 1.0, the SharedView team was disbanded and absorbed by other teams in Microsoft such as Office Communicator and Microsoft Lync.

SharedView is not compatible with systems that have IE 9 installed.

Current version of SharedView is 8.0.5725.0.

SharedView was officially EOLed on 31 January 2012, and was finally shut down on 3 February 2012 at 3:30pm, PST.

See also 
 Windows Meeting Space
 Microsoft Office Groove

References

External links 
Download Microsoft SharedView v1.0
Microsoft SharedView Support Forums

Groupware
SharedView